Campigny may refer to places in France:

Campigny, Calvados
Campigny, Eure

See also

 Champigny (disambiguation)